Mike Jackson is a British artist based in Dorset, England. (1966)

He works in a traditional darkroom, using unique cameraless techniques often involving the luminogram process.

His book ‘Flatland’ was published by 21st Editions  In 2018

His work is in the collection of The National Gallery Of Art in Washington

References

Landscape photographers
British abstract artists
1966 births
Living people
Welsh photographers